Kovalčík or Kovalcik is a surname. Notable people with the surname include:

 Ivan Kovalčik Mileševac (born 1968), Serbian icon and fresco painter
 Štefan Kovalčík (1921–1973), Czechoslovakian/Slovak Olympic cross country skier
 Zak Kovalcik (born 1983), American track cyclist